The Real Fábrica de Cristales de La Granja ("Royal Factory of Glass and Crystal of La Granja") is a glass factory in San Ildefonso near Segovia, Spain. It was built as a royal manufactory in the eighteenth century.

History
It was established in 1727 by Philip V of Spain. In that year, funded by the crown, the Catalan artisan Ventura Sit installed a small oven which manufactured float glass for the windows and mirrors of the Royal Palace of La Granja de San Ildefonso, which was under construction in the 1720s. Sit had previously worked at Nuevo Baztán where a glass factory failed because of inadequate fuel supplies.  At La Granja there was an abundant supply of wood for the factory in the Sierra de Guadarrama.

Bartolome Sureda y Miserol, previously director of the Real Fábrica de Porcelana del Buen Retiro, the Real Fábrica de Paños in Guadalajara, and the Real Fábrica de Loza de la Moncloa, became director of the Real Fábrica de Cristales de La Granja in 1822. Glass blowing and glassware production could be viewed at the factory. The wares of the royal factory were exported to the Americas, which caused financial losses to the other countries who exported as well. By 1836, with the royal factory experiencing financial hardship, the Royal Treasury formally took over the facility which, unlike other royal factories, failed to financially support itself.

Fundación Centro Nacional del Vidrio
To revive the traditions of the Royal Glass Factory, the National Glass Centre Foundation was established in 1982 in the eighteenth-century building. The Ministerial Order of 1989 was formalized by law in 1994, its basic objective being “the promotion, development, education, research and dissemination of craftsmanship and history of glass manufacture artistic and other cultural and scientific activities related to art and art glass.”

References

Bibliography
 Julio Tomás Arribas, Historia de Segovia. Segovia, Caja de Ahorros y Monte de Piedad de Segovia, 1987.  (in Spanish).

External links

Glassmaking companies
Manufacturing companies of Spain
Companies based in Castile and León
San Ildefonso (Segovia)
Companies established in 1727
1727 establishments in Spain